Funaki (written: 船木) is a Japanese surname. Notable people with the surname include:

Kazuyoshi Funaki (born 1975), Olympic ski jumper
Mari Funaki (1950–2010), Australian contemporary jeweller, designer, metal-smith and sculptor
Masakatsu Funaki (born 1969), professional wrestler and mixed martial artist
Shoichi Funaki (born 1968), professional wrestler formerly for World Wrestling Entertainment and Michinoku Pro Wrestling
Steven Funaki Adams (born 1993), New Zealand basketball player

Japanese-language surnames